Rusty sedge is a common name for several plants and may refer to:
 
 Fimbristylis ferruginea, plant native to parts of Africa, southern Asia, and South America, and Australia
 Fimbristylis polytrichoides, plant native to east Africa, Madagascar, China, Southeast Asia, New Guinea and Australia